Toetu'u Taufa (born October 8, 1980 in Nuku'alofa) is a former Tongan-born Japanese rugby union player. He plays at the No. 8 position or at flanker. He plays for the Kintetsu Liners in Japan's Top League.

Taufa made his World Cup debut at the 2011 Rugby World Cup, his only match was in their 23 all draw against .

References

External links
2011 RWC Profile
ESPN Scrum Profile
Kintetsu Liners Profile (Japanese)

1980 births
Living people
Japanese rugby union players
Tongan rugby union players
Hanazono Kintetsu Liners players
Tongan expatriate rugby union players
Expatriate rugby union players in Japan
Naturalized citizens of Japan
People from Tongatapu
Tongan emigrants to Japan
Japan international rugby union players